Ava may be,
 Ava Guarani language
 Avá-Canoeiro language